Things We Lost in the Fire may refer to:

Things We Lost in the Fire (album), a 2001 album by Low
Things We Lost in the Fire (film), a 2007 film starring Halle Berry and Benicio del Toro
"Things We Lost in the Fire" (song), a 2013 song by Bastille
"Things We Lost in the Fire" (Grey's Anatomy), a 2015 episode of the television show Grey's Anatomy
Things We Lost in the Fire (story collection), a 2015 book by Mariana Enríquez